Lygropia tripunctata, the sweetpotato leafroller, is a moth in the family Crambidae. It was described by Johan Christian Fabricius in 1794. It is found in the United States, where it has been recorded from Texas to South Carolina and Florida. It is also found from the West Indies and Central America to Brazil.

The wingspan is about 26 mm. The wings are light yellowish with a dark grayish-brown band along the costa and then along the outer margin of both the forewings and hindwings. There are two black dots along the costa. There is a dark discal spot on the hindwings. Adults have been recorded on wing from March to October in the United States.

The larvae feed on Turbina corymbosa, Merremia umbellata and Ipomoea species.

References

Moths described in 1794
Lygropia